Buley is a surname. Notable people with the surname include:

E. C. Buley (1869–1933), Australian journalist and author
Nidhi Buley (born 1986), Indian cricketer
R. Carlyle Buley (1893–1968), American historian and educator

See also
Bewley (disambiguation)
Ritchko-Buley